The Journey Through Hallowed Ground National Heritage Area is a federally designated National Heritage Area in portions of Pennsylvania, West Virginia, Maryland and Virginia.

History and background
The Journey Through Hallowed Ground National Heritage Area was established on May 8, 2008 by Public Law 110-229, the Consolidated Natural Resources Act of 2008. The designation provides a framework for the promotion and interpretation of the area's cultural and historic character, with particular emphasis on the region's role in the American Civil War, and the preservation of the natural and built environment.

The National Heritage Area extends from Gettysburg in the north to Monticello in the south. It is managed by the Journey Through Hallowed Ground Partnership, which encompasses the Journey Through Hallowed Ground National Scenic Byway. The heritage area roughly follows the route of the Old Carolina Road.

The Journey Through Hallowed Ground Partnership is a non-profit organization dedicated to raising the awareness of the history within the Gettysburg-Monticello corridor. Its mission is to promote and support civic engagement through history education, economic development through heritage tourism, and the preservation of cultural landscapes in one of the nation’s most important historic regions. Partners include over 350 municipal, business, and non-profit organizations, including many elected bodies within the four-state region. All related entities are collectively referred to as the Journey Through Hallowed Ground.

The Journey Through Hallowed Ground National Heritage Area denotes the region that Congress designated as a Journey Through Hallowed Ground National Heritage Area in 2008, in a program affiliated with the National Park Service. There are 15 counties in the Journey Through Hallowed Ground National Heritage Area, spanning those four states. With 400 years of European, American, and African-American heritage, the Journey Through Hallowed Ground is a National Heritage Area with a National Scenic Byway running through it. It contains World Heritage sites, over 10,000 sites on the National Register of Historic Places, 49 National Historic districts, nine Presidential homes & sites,  13 National Park Units, hundreds of African-American and Native American heritage sites, 30 Historic Main Street communities, sites from the Revolutionary War, French-Indian War, War of 1812, and the largest single collection of Civil War sites in the nation.

The Journey Through Hallowed Ground National Heritage Area comprises Adams County in Pennsylvania, Frederick and Carroll counties and the eastern part of Washington county in Maryland, the area around Harpers Ferry in Jefferson County, West Virginia, and Loudoun, Fauquier, Culpeper, Orange, Albemarle, Greene, Madison and Rappahannock counties and parts of Fairfax, Prince William and Spotsylvania counties in Virginia.

National Scenic Byway

The Journey Through Hallowed Ground National Scenic Byway refers to the 180-mile road that intersects the Journey Through Hallowed Ground National Heritage Area. Once known as Old Carolina Road, the Journey Through Hallowed Ground National Scenic Byway runs 180 miles through three states and includes portions of US Rt. 15, VA 231, VA 20, and VA 53, running through Virginia, Maryland, and Pennsylvania. The JTHG National Scenic Byway is one of 150 scenic byways nationwide designated by the U.S. Secretary of Transportation.

National History Academy
In the summer of 2018, the Journey Through Hallowed Ground launched National History Academy, an innovative five-week residential summer program for top high school students from throughout the country. The Academy teaches the foundations of American democracy through place-based education.

National History Academy’s mission is to inspire students to understand the foundations of American democracy and the responsibilities of citizenship. The first of its kind, the Academy was founded to address the current crisis in American civic and historical literacy.

During the five-week course, students study American history, from the Native American settlement era through the civil-rights movement, with an emphasis on significant events and figures between 1765 and 1865. The group alternates between classroom studies and visits to historic sites within and near the  Journey Through Hallowed Ground National Heritage Area.

National History Academy’s motto, “Historia Est Magistra Vitae,” is taken from Cicero’s De Oratore and means “history is the teacher of life.”

Admissions and student life
The Academy has capacity for ninety rising 10th, 11th, and 12th grade students each summer. In 2018, 233 students applied, and 89 students from 28 states enrolled. Courses are taught by six master teachers. Students are also overseen by twelve college counselors.

National History Academy is hosted at the Foxcroft School in Middleburg, Virginia, a private secondary school. The campus is located 45 miles from Washington, D.C. and within a three-hour drive of all the historic sites that the students visit. Filmmaker Ken Burns is featured in the Academy’s promotional video.

Curriculum
The curriculum is built around four components: (1) history cases; (2) parliamentary debates; (3) a speaker series; and (4) visits to the defining sites of American history.

History cases
The Academy uses the case-based History of American Democracy curriculum developed by Harvard Business School Professor David A. Moss. The cases provide an interdisciplinary and contextual examination of key historic events, permitting students to consider multiple viewpoints and to place themselves in the role of decision makers. In 2018, Professor Moss taught the first case on the United States Constitution at James Madison’s Montpelier.

Better Angels debates
The Academy offers a parliamentary debate program in partnership with the Better Angels and its founder, David Blankenhorn. The College Board provided the initial funding for this partnership. The debates are designed to encourage civil discourse across the partisan divide in an open and respectful environment. This formal style of parliamentary debate allows students to explore challenging contemporary issues in contrast to the historical debates studied in the cases.

Guest speakers
The Academy invites more than 20 nationally recognized guest speakers to supplement classroom activities. Among the 2018 guest speakers were David Rubenstein, Ernest Green, Margaret Richardson, Brent Glass, Jon Parrish Peede, Trevor Potter, Douglas Owsley, Ron Maxwell and Robert Duvall.

Site visits and unique experiences
The Academy alternates classroom work with visits to the defining historic sites in the region, from Gettysburg to Harpers Ferry, Washington, D.C., Charlottesville and Colonial Williamsburg. Students experience iconic National Parks, museums, presidential homes, battlefields, and Civil Rights sites.

References

External links
 Journey Through Hallowed Ground website
 National History Academy website

 
National Scenic Byways
2008 establishments in Pennsylvania
Protected areas established in 2008
2008 establishments in West Virginia
2008 establishments in Maryland
2008 establishments in Virginia
Summer schools
Pennsylvania in the American Civil War
Maryland in the American Civil War
Virginia in the American Civil War
West Virginia in the American Civil War
National Heritage Areas of the United States
Protected areas of Adams County, Pennsylvania
Protected areas of Frederick County, Maryland
Protected areas of Cecil County, Maryland
Protected areas of Jefferson County, West Virginia
Protected areas of Loudoun County, Virginia
Protected areas of Fauquier County, Virginia
Protected areas of Culpeper County, Virginia
Protected areas of Orange County, Virginia
Protected areas of Albemarle County, Virginia
Protected areas of Greene County, Virginia
Protected areas of Madison County, Virginia
Protected areas of Rappahannock County, Virginia
Protected areas of Fairfax County, Virginia
Protected areas of Prince William County, Virginia
Protected areas of Spotsylvania County, Virginia